Garrett Geros (born September 3, 1999) is an American para-snowboarder who competes in the SB-LL2 category.

Career
Geros represented the United States at the 2022 Winter Paralympics and won a silver medal in the snowboard cross event.

References 

1999 births
Living people
American male snowboarders
People from Cartersville, Georgia
Paralympic snowboarders of the United States
Snowboarders at the 2022 Winter Paralympics
Medalists at the 2022 Winter Paralympics
Paralympic medalists in snowboarding
Paralympic silver medalists for the United States
20th-century American people
21st-century American people